Trevor Owen  (born 1873) was a Welsh international footballer. He was part of the Wales national football team, playing 2 matches. He played his first match on 18 March 1899 against Scotland and his last match on 20 March 1899 against England. At club level he played for Wrexham, where he played in the 1896 Welsh Cup Final against Bangor City, Crewe Alexandra and Wolverhampton Wanderers.

See also
 List of Wales international footballers (alphabetical)

References

1873 births
People from Llangollen
Sportspeople from Denbighshire
Welsh footballers
Wales international footballers
Wrexham A.F.C. players
Crewe Alexandra F.C. players
Wolverhampton Wanderers F.C. players
Year of death missing
Association footballers not categorized by position